The CREC Greater Hartford Academy of the Arts Half Day (known formerly as the Greater Hartford Academy of the Arts) is an integrated magnet arts high school serving students in Hartford, Connecticut and its surrounding towns. It is one of four schools located on the 16-acre (65,000 m2) campus of The Learning Corridor.  

The Capital Region Education Council (CREC) has managed the school since it was established in 1985. It is a half day program meaning that students attend their home district’s school for their academics and then attend the Academy in the afternoon for arts education.

History
The Academy was founded in 1985 by Janet Brown. The school was initially housed in a former funeral parlor in Hartford’s South End with an annex building next door.  In 2000, the school moved to the new Learning Corridor Campus. Part of this expansion included a recital hall, theater, black box theater, music rehearsal spaces, and visual arts studios/galleries.

With the addition of the theater space, the Academy started offering a full production season as part of its program.

Notable accomplishments includes performances at the 2012 Olympics and a performance of David Brubeck’s “Real Ambassadors.” Additionally, the Academy has received the “Best Arts Magnet School” title from the Magnet Schools of America.

In 2008, as part of the expansions of magnet schools in Connecticut, the Academy started to additionally offer a full day program integrated with the school’s original half day only model. As of 2019, this model of an integrated half/full day program changed and a separate “Greater Hartford Academy of the Arts Full Day” as a different school with different arts training model and course offerings but includes a traditional high school curriculum.

The Greater Hartford Academy of the Arts Half Day remained separately as a school focused strictly on arts.

In 2005 GHAA was given the performance rights to be the first school in the USA to produce the musical CATS. In association with the Really Useful Company in the UK the show was a sold out success.

School
Students chose a major from several arts departments which are Dance, Musical Theater, Music (vocal, instrumental, jazz, or classical), Theater, Visual Arts, and Theater Design and Production. Students study under the direction of professional artist instructors. In addition to daily arts training, students take master classes with accomplished visiting artists. Many of the artists instructors have resumes that range from Broadway, television, and have had plays and other works published.

During the year, students have many opportunities at the Academy to audition to take part in its production season each year which include Choreographers’ Showcase ( a yearly showcasing of dance performances from accomplished choreographers), a spring musical, and other productions

Notable alumni

 Anita Antoinette
 Zaccai Curtis
 Christopher Larkin (actor)
 Jimmy Greene

References

External links
 

Schools in Hartford, Connecticut
Educational institutions established in 1985
Schools of the performing arts in the United States
Public high schools in Connecticut
Magnet schools in Connecticut
1985 establishments in Connecticut